Joseph Michael Maese (born December 2, 1978) is a former American football long snapper. He was drafted by the Baltimore Ravens in the sixth round (194th overall) of the 2001 NFL Draft. He played college football at New Mexico. He was also a member of the Detroit Lions of the National Football League (NFL), as well as the Baltimore Blackbirds of the American Indoor Football Association.

Professional career
Maese was drafted by the Baltimore Ravens in the sixth round of the 2001 NFL Draft. He was the first pure long snapper ever drafted and the only long snapper drafted that year. He played college football at The University of New Mexico. Maese also played for the Detroit Lions and the Baltimore Blackbirds of the American Indoor Football Association.

Post-football
Following his professional football career, Maese was employed as a firefighter in Howard County, Maryland.

References

1978 births
Living people
American football defensive ends
American football linebackers
American football long snappers
New Mexico Lobos football players
Baltimore Ravens players
Detroit Lions players
Baltimore Blackbirds players
People from Morenci, Arizona